Eunisses Hernandez (born 1990) is an American activist and politician, currently serving as a member of the Los Angeles City Council for the 1st district since 2022. A member of the Democratic Party and the Democratic Socialists of America, Hernandez defeated incumbent councilmember Gil Cedillo in an upset in the 2022 election.

A self-described police and prison abolitionist, Hernandez was endorsed by progressive groups and leaders like City Councilman Mike Bonin and Dolores Huerta, and the Los Angeles Times. Hernandez declared victory on June 18, 2022, before the final vote tally, which was certified on July 1, 2022. Cedillo conceded the same day.

Early life and career 
Hernandez was born in 1990 to Juan and Leticia Hernandez and grew up in Highland Park, Los Angeles. Early in her life, Hernandez thought about becoming a police officer. She attended Franklin High School and later California State University, Los Angeles for one year in 2009, where she majored in civil engineering. During her employment at Universal Studios Hollywood, she graduated from California State University, Long Beach with a bachelor's degree in criminal justice in 2013. It was during her time at CSU Long Beach where she "experienced [...] a revelation" after she took a class for criminology and the War on Drugs.

Career 

Hernandez started her career in 2014 as a policy coordinator for the Drug Policy Alliance where she helped with the passing of Senate Bill 180 and California Proposition 64. In 2018, she moved to JustLeadershipUSA as a campaign coordinator for JusticeLA where she helped with stopping the county's $3.5 billion jail plan. In 2019, she was appointed by the Los Angeles Board of Supervisors to be a community stakeholder for an Alternatives to Incarceration working group.

In 2020, she co-founded La Defensa with Ivette Alé, a women-led organization that supports reducing the number of incarcerated people in Los Angeles County. That same year she co-chaired Measure J, a ballot initiative that would allocate at least 10% of Los Angeles County's funding for community reinvestment and incarceration alternatives. The ballot, which she co-chaired with future Assemblymember Isaac Bryan and future councilmember Hugo Soto-Martinez, passed with 57.12% of the vote. In June 2021, though, the measure was blocked by Judge Mary Strobel as being unconstitutional and the implementation of the measure has been slow.

Los Angeles City Council 
On October 8, 2021, Hernandez announced that she would be running for Los Angeles City Council District 1 in the 2022 elections. After three other candidates were disqualified, she was the only opponent against incumbent Gil Cedillo. Hernandez was endorsed by multiple progressive groups and leaders, with Council-member Mike Bonin and Dolores Huerta endorsing her in the primary. Hernandez ultimately unseated Cedillo with 53.9% of the vote, avoiding the need for a runoff.

Electoral history

References 

Living people
1990 births
Activists from Los Angeles
Los Angeles City Council members
21st-century American politicians
21st-century American women politicians
Hispanic and Latino American politicians
Hispanic and Latino American women in politics
California Democrats
California socialists
Police abolitionists
Prison abolitionists
Democratic Socialists of America politicians from California
Women city councillors in California